The 2015 Challenger Banque Nationale de Saguenay was a professional tennis tournament played on indoor hard courts. It was the 10th edition of the tournament and part of the 2015 ITF Women's Circuit, offering a total of $50,000 in prize money. It took place in Saguenay, Quebec, Canada between October 19 and October 25, 2015.

Singles main-draw entrants

Seeds

1 Rankings are as of October 12, 2015

Other entrants
The following players received wildcards into the singles main draw:
 Isabelle Boulais
 Marie-Alexandre Leduc
 Charlotte Robillard-Millette
 Aleksandra Wozniak

The following players received entry from the qualifying draw:
 Nadja Gilchrist
 Mari Osaka
 Fanny Stollár
 Ashley Weinhold

The following player received entry as a lucky loser:
  Karman Kaur Thandi

Champions

Singles

 Jovana Jakšić def.  Amra Sadiković, 6–3, 6–7(5–7), 6–1

Doubles

 Mihaela Buzărnescu /  Justyna Jegiołka def.  Sharon Fichman /  Maria Sanchez, 7–6(8–6), 4–6, [10–7]

References

External links
Official website

Challenger Banque Nationale de Saguenay
Challenger de Saguenay
Challenger Banque Nationale de Saguenay